Big Ed may refer to:


Nickname
 Ed "Big Ed" Burns (c. 1842–?), American con man and crime boss
 Ed Delahanty (1867–1903), American Major League Baseball player
 Ed Reulbach (1882–1961), American Major League Baseball pitcher
 Ed Sanders (boxer) (1930–1954), American boxer and 1952 Olympic heavyweight champion
 Ed Stevens (baseball) (1925–2012), American Major League Baseball player
 Ed Walsh (1881–1959), American Major League Baseball pitcher and manager
 Ed White (American football) (born 1947), American former National Football League player

Stage name
 Big Ed (rapper)

TV characters
 Edward Melvin Deline, on the  American TV series Las Vegas
 Ed Dhandapani, on the American TV series Scrubs
 Big Ed Hurley, on the American TV series Twin Peaks and the film Twin Peaks: Fire Walk with Me

See also 
 Big Eddy (disambiguation)
 
 

Lists of people by nickname
Nicknames